Hallum is a surname. Notable people with the surname include:

Carsten Hallum (born 1969), Danish footballer and mechanical worker
Jacqui Hallum (born 1977), British artist
Jake Hallum (1938–2015), American football coach and scout